See You in September is a 2010 American romantic comedy directed by Tamara Tunie and starring Estella Warren, Michael Rispoli, Whoopi Goldberg, and Justin Kirk. The alternative title is Crazy Love. The film premiered in April 2010 at Newport Beach International Film Festival and was released on DVD on February 8, 2011. See You in September is Tamara Tunie's first film both as director and as producer.

Plot
Lindsay is a successful producer of commercials, but, as it often happens in big cities, her personal life is not well. Gentlemen chase her and even propose to marry, but she feels that all of them are not her type. Only psychoanalysis sessions do help her, and she can barely live without them. But one day her doctor leaves for vacation until September. Lindsay is upset but comes up with a brilliant idea—to assemble her own support group for  people with the same personal problems.

Various people join the group, including two gangsters intent on robbing all those present. They bound all the participants and leave the victims alone, so they have to sit together and solve their problems. They do so.

Cast
 Estella Warren as Lindsay 
 Liza Lapira as Monica 
 Justin Kirk as A.J. 
 David Eigenberg as Max 
 Sandra Bernhard as Charlotte 
 Michael Rispoli as Terrence 
 Maulik Pancholy as Roger 
 Michael Hyatt as Eve
 Christopher Sieber as Steven 
 James McDaniel as Lewis 
 Brian Anthony Wilson as Cop 
 Jason Kravits as Stevie 
 Henry Hodges as Henry
 Lindsey Kraft as Dagney
 Whoopi Goldberg as Lindsay's Therapist

References

External links

2010 films
2010 romantic comedy films
American romantic comedy films
2010s English-language films
2010s American films